Romania's political framework is a semi-presidential representative democratic republic where the Prime Minister is the head of government while the President represents the country internationally, signs some decrees, approves laws promulgated by parliament, and nominations as head of state. Romania has a multi-party system, with legislative power vested in the government and the two chambers of Parliament: the Chamber of Deputies and the Senate. The judiciary is independent of the executive and the legislature. From 1948 until 1989, the Communist rule political structure took place in the framework of a one-party socialist republic governed by the Romanian Communist Party (PCR) as its only legal party.

Romania's 1991 constitution (amended in 2003) proclaims it a democratic and social republic, deriving its sovereignty from the people. According to the constitution, "Human dignity, civic rights and freedoms, the unhindered development of human personality, justice, and political pluralism are supreme and guaranteed values."

The constitution provides for a President, a Parliament, a Constitutional Court, and a separate court system which includes the High Court of Cassation and Justice. The right to vote is granted to all citizens over 18 years of age.

The Economist Intelligence Unit rated Romania as a "flawed democracy" in 2016.

Executive branch 

|President
|Klaus Iohannis
|Independent
|21 December 2014
|-
|Prime Minister
|Nicolae Ciucă
|National Liberal Party (PNL)
|25 November 2021
|-
|}

The president is elected by popular vote for a maximum of two five-year terms (four-year terms until 2004). The president is head of state (charged with safeguarding the constitution, foreign affairs, and the proper functioning of public authority), supreme commander of the armed forces, and chairperson of the Supreme Council of National Defense. According to the constitution, the president acts as a mediator among the state's power centers and between the state and society. The president nominates the prime minister after consultation with the party holding an absolute majority in Parliament or, if there is no such majority, with all the parties in Parliament.

Ambiguity in the Constitution of Romania (Article 85 (1), Article 103 (1)) may lead to situations where a coalition of parties obtaining an absolute majority in Parliament, or a party holding a relative majority in Parliament, would be unable to nominate a prime minister because the president would refuse the nomination (with no party holding an absolute majority in Parliament). According to Article 103 (1), "unless no such majority exists", is interpreted by the president as "unless no such party exists" (although an absolute majority may be formed by one party, a coalition of parties, or an alliance).

In the 2008 parliamentary elections, the Alliance PSD+PC won 33.09 percent of the seats in the Chamber of Deputies and 34.16 percent of the seats in the Senate. The PNL won 18.57 percent of the seats in the Chamber of Deputies and 18.74 percent of the seats in the Senate, giving both parties a majority in the Chamber of Deputies and the Senate. However, the president nominated a member of the PDL (which won less than 32.36 percent of the seats in the Chamber of Deputies and 33.54 percent of the seats in the Senate. The nominated prime minister chooses the other members of the government, and the government and its program must be confirmed by a vote of confidence from Parliament.

Legislative branch 

|President of the Senate (ad interim/acting)
|Alina Gorghiu
|National Liberal Party (PNL)
|29 June 2022
|-
|President of the Chamber of Deputies
|Marcel Ciolacu
|Social Democratic Party (PSD)
|23 November 2021
|}

The national legislature is a bicameral parliament, consisting of the Chamber of Deputies and the Senate. Members are elected to four-year terms by universal suffrage in a party-list proportional representation electoral system. Beginning in 2008, members are elected by mixed-member proportional representation.

The number of senators and deputies has varied in each legislature, reflecting population changes. In 2008, there were 137 senatorial seats and 334 seats in the Chamber of Deputies; of the 334 deputy seats, 18 were held by ethnic minority representatives which would not meet the five-percent electoral threshold required for other parties and organizations.

Classification of political parties 

Romania has a multiparty political system, which makes a majority government virtually impossible (unless a very high score is achieved in the legislative election by one particular political party). Smaller parliamentary parties have sometimes merged with larger ones during previous legislatures before 2020. Currently, there are five main parliamentary parties (excluding the 18 ethnic-minority parties which have one representative each) as follows:

The main four non-parliamentary parties (the first two around the five-percent threshold) with local representatives are as follows:

Unlike other former Soviet-bloc countries (such as, most notably, neighbouring Republic of Moldova), no political party claiming to be the successor of the Romanian Communist Party (PCR) has been or is currently a significant player on the political scene, although the main continuator of FSN, more specifically PSD, has many times raised suspicions and accusations from electoral contenders regarding the past political careers of many of its current and former members who were first tier, high-ranking members of the PCR before the 1989 Romanian Revolution. The PNL also has many former Securitate members, former PCR members, or their relatives, in part through the merger with the PDL in 2014 but not only.

Latest elections

Presidential election 

The last presidential election was held on 10 and 24 November 2019.

European Parliament election 

The last European Parliamentary election was held on 26 May 2019.

|-
|- style="background-color:#C9C9C9"
!style="background-color:#E9E9E9;text-align:center;" colspan="4" | Party
!style="background-color:#E9E9E9;text-align:center;" rowspan="2" | No. ofCandidates
!style="background-color:#E9E9E9;text-align:center;" rowspan="2" | Votes
!style="background-color:#E9E9E9;text-align:center;" rowspan="2" | Elected
!style="background-color:#E9E9E9;text-align:center;" rowspan="2" | Changein seats
!style="background-color:#E9E9E9;text-align:center;" rowspan="2" | % of seats
!style="background-color:#E9E9E9;text-align:center;" rowspan="2" | % of votes
|-
!style="background-color:#E9E9E9;text-align:center;" colspan="2" | National Party
!style="background-color:#E9E9E9;text-align:center;" | EU Party
!style="background-color:#E9E9E9;text-align:center;" | EP Group
|-
| 
| style="text-align:left;" |
| style="text-align:left;" | EPP
| style="text-align:left;" | EPP Group
| style="text-align:right;" | 43
| style="text-align:right;" | 2,449,068
| style="text-align:right;" | 10
| style="text-align:right;" | 
| style="text-align:right;" | 30.30%
| style="text-align:right;" | 27.00%
|-
| 
| style="text-align:left;" | Social Democratic Party()
| style="text-align:left;" | PES
| style="text-align:left;" | S&D
| style="text-align:right;" | 43
| style="text-align:right;" | 2,040,765
| style="text-align:right;" | 9
| style="text-align:right;" | 
| style="text-align:right;" | 27.27%
| style="text-align:right;" | 22.50%
|-
| 
| style="text-align:left;" | 2020 USR-PLUS Alliance()
 Save Romania Union()
 Freedom, Unity and Solidarity Party()
| style="text-align:left;" | —
| style="text-align:left;" | ALDE&R
| style="text-align:right;" | 40
| style="text-align:right;" | 2,028,236
| style="text-align:right;" | 8
| style="text-align:right;" |  8
| style="text-align:right;" | 24.24%
| style="text-align:right;" | 22.36%
|-
| style="background-color:"|
| style="text-align:left;" | PRO Romania()
| style="text-align:left;" | EDP
| style="text-align:left;" | S&D
ECR
| style="text-align:right;" | 43
| style="text-align:right;" | 583,916
| style="text-align:right;" | 2
| style="text-align:right;" |  0
| style="text-align:right;" | 6.06%
| style="text-align:right;" | 6.44%
|-
| style="background-color:#90EE90;" |
| style="text-align:left;" | People's Movement Party()
| style="text-align:left;" | —
| style="text-align:left;" | EPP Group
| style="text-align:right;" | 43
| style="text-align:right;" | 522,104
| style="text-align:right;" | 2
| style="text-align:right;" |  2
| style="text-align:right;" | 6.06%
| style="text-align:right;" | 5.76%
|-
| 
| style="text-align:left;" | Democratic Alliance of Hungarians in Romania()
| style="text-align:left;" | EPP
| style="text-align:left;" | EPP Group
| style="text-align:right;" | 43
| style="text-align:right;" | 476,777
| style="text-align:right;" | 2
| style="text-align:right;" |  0
| style="text-align:right;" | 6.06%
| style="text-align:right;" | 5.26%
|-
| 
| style="text-align:left;" | Alliance of Liberals and Democrats()
| style="text-align:left;" | ALDE
| style="text-align:left;" | —
| style="text-align:right;" | 43
| style="text-align:right;" | 372,760
| style="text-align:right;" | 0
| style="text-align:right;" |  2
| style="text-align:right;" | 0%
| style="text-align:right;" | 4.11%
|-
| style="background-color:#DDDDDD;" |
| style="text-align:left;" | Independent candidate: Peter Costea
| style="text-align:left;" | —
| style="text-align:left;" | —
| style="text-align:right;" | 1
| style="text-align:right;" | 131,021
| style="text-align:right;" | 0
| style="text-align:right;" |  0
| style="text-align:right;" | 0%
| style="text-align:right;" | 1.44%
|-
| style="background-color:#DDDDDD;" |
| style="text-align:left;" | Independent candidate: George-Nicolae Simion
| style="text-align:left;" | —
| style="text-align:left;" | —
| style="text-align:right;" | 1
| style="text-align:right;" | 117,141
| style="text-align:right;" | 0
| style="text-align:right;" |  0
| style="text-align:right;" | 0%
| style="text-align:right;" | 1.29%
|-
| style="background-color:#DDDDDD;" |
| style="text-align:left;" | Independent candidate: Gregoriana Carmen Tudoran
| style="text-align:left;" | —
| style="text-align:left;" | —
| style="text-align:right;" | 1
| style="text-align:right;" | 100,669
| style="text-align:right;" | 0
| style="text-align:right;" |  0
| style="text-align:right;" | 0%
| style="text-align:right;" | 1.11%
|-
| style="background-color:#D90000"|
| style="text-align:left;" | National Union for the Progress of Romania()
| style="text-align:left;" | —
| style="text-align:left;" | No MEPs
| style="text-align:right;" | 43
| style="text-align:right;" | 54,942
| style="text-align:right;" | 0
| style="text-align:right;" |  0
| style="text-align:right;" | 0%
| style="text-align:right;" | 0.61%
|-
| 
| style="text-align:left;" | Prodemo Party()
| style="text-align:left;" | —
| style="text-align:left;" | No MEPs
| style="text-align:right;" | 26
| style="text-align:right;" | 53,351
| style="text-align:right;" | 0
| style="text-align:right;" |  0
| style="text-align:right;" | 0%
| style="text-align:right;" | 0.59%
|-
| style="background-color:|
| style="text-align:left;" | United Romania Party()
| style="text-align:left;" | —
| style="text-align:left;" | No MEPs
| style="text-align:right;" | 30
| style="text-align:right;" | 51,787
| style="text-align:right;" | 0
| style="text-align:right;" |  0
| style="text-align:right;" | 0%
| style="text-align:right;" | 0.57%
|-
| style="background-color:red|
| style="text-align:left;" | Romanian Socialist Party()
| style="text-align:left;" | —
| style="text-align:left;" | No MEPs
| style="text-align:right;" | 28
| style="text-align:right;" | 40,135
| style="text-align:right;" | 0
| style="text-align:right;" |  0
| style="text-align:right;" | 0%
| style="text-align:right;" | 0.44%
|-
| style="background-color:red|
| style="text-align:left;" | Independent Social Democratic Party()
| style="text-align:left;" | —
| style="text-align:left;" | No MEPs
| style="text-align:right;" | 43
| style="text-align:right;" | 26,439
| style="text-align:right;" | 0
| style="text-align:right;" |  0
| style="text-align:right;" | 0%
| style="text-align:right;" | 0.29%
|-
| 
| style="text-align:left;" | National Unity Block - NUB( - BUN)
| style="text-align:left;" | —
| style="text-align:left;" | No MEPs
| style="text-align:right;" | 12
| style="text-align:right;" | 20,411
| style="text-align:right;" | 0
| style="text-align:right;" |  0
| style="text-align:right;" | 0%
| style="text-align:right;" | 0.23%
|-
| style="text-align:left;" colspan=4 |Total: 18,267,256 expected voters (turnout – 51.20%)
! style="text-align:right;" | 483
! style="text-align:right;" | 9,352,472
! style="text-align:right;" | 33
! style="text-align:right;" |  1
! style="text-align:right;" | 100%
! style="text-align:right;" | 100%
|-
| style="text-align:left;" colspan=11 |Source: Summary of the results
|-
|}

Notes:

 After the 2014 election, PNL merged with PD-L/PDL and joined the EPP, and EPP Group.
 Prior to the 2019 election, Save Romania Union had no MEPs, and no European affiliation.
 According to the website of the ALDE Group, USR PLUS will be part of its new group called "ALDE plus Renaissance plus USR-PLUS.
 Monica Macovei, the founder of the M10 party, was ousted.
 Daciana Sârbu sits with the S&D.
 Laurențiu Rebega sits with the ECR.
 After the lists have been approved by the Central Electoral Bureau, three candidates of the 2020 USR-PLUS Alliance have renounced their candidacy. The Central Electoral Bureau ruled the elimination of said positions on the list.

Legislative election 

The latest legislative election was held on 6 December 2020. The two tables below are represented the results for both the Senate and the Chamber of Deputies:

Chamber of Deputies

Senate

Local election 

The latest general local election was held on 27 September 2020.

|-
|- style="background-color:#C9C9C9"
! style="background-color:#E9E9E9;text-align:center;" colspan=2 rowspan=2 | Party
! style="background-color:#E9E9E9;text-align:center;" colspan=3 | Mayor of Bucharest (PGMB)
! style="background-color:#E9E9E9;text-align:center;" colspan=3 | Mayors (P)
! style="background-color:#E9E9E9;text-align:center;" colspan=3 | Local Councilsseats (CL)
! style="background-color:#E9E9E9;text-align:center;" colspan=3 | County Councilsseats (CJ)
|-
|- style="background-color:#C9C9C9"
! style="background-color:#E9E9E9;text-align:center;" |Votes
! style="background-color:#E9E9E9;text-align:center;" |%
! style="background-color:#E9E9E9;text-align:center;" |Seats
! style="background-color:#E9E9E9;text-align:center;" |Votes
! style="background-color:#E9E9E9;text-align:center;" |%
! style="background-color:#E9E9E9;text-align:center;" |Seats
! style="background-color:#E9E9E9;text-align:center;" |Votes
! style="background-color:#E9E9E9;text-align:center;" |%
! style="background-color:#E9E9E9;text-align:center;" |Seats
! style="background-color:#E9E9E9;text-align:center;" |Votes
! style="background-color:#E9E9E9;text-align:center;" |%
! style="background-color:#E9E9E9;text-align:center;" |Seats
|-
| 
| style="text-align:left;" | National Liberal Party ( - PNL)
| style="text-align:right;" |282,631
(with the 2020 USR-PLUS Alliance)
| style="text-align:right;" |42.81%
(with the 2020 USR-PLUS Alliance)
| style="text-align:right;" |1
| style="text-align:right;" |2,578,820
| style="text-align:right;" |34.58%
| style="text-align:right;" |1,232
| style="text-align:right;" |2,420,413
| style="text-align:right;" |32.88%
| style="text-align:right;" |14,182
| style="text-align:right;" |2,212,904
| style="text-align:right;" |30.76%
| style="text-align:right;" |474
|-
| 
| style="text-align:left;" | Social Democratic Party ( - PSD)
| style="text-align:right;" |250,690
| style="text-align:right;" |37.97%
| style="text-align:right;" |0
| style="text-align:right;" |2,262,791
| style="text-align:right;" |30.34%
| style="text-align:right;" |1,362
| style="text-align:right;" |2,090,777
| style="text-align:right;" |28.40%
| style="text-align:right;" |13,820
| style="text-align:right;" |1,605,721
| style="text-align:right;" |22.32%
| style="text-align:right;" |362
|-
| style="background-color:#00aae7 "|
| style="text-align:left;" | 2020 USR-PLUS Alliance ( - USR-PLUS)
| style="text-align:right;" |282,631
(with PNL)
| style="text-align:right;" |42.81%
(with PNL)
| style="text-align:right;" |1
| style="text-align:right;" |490,362
| style="text-align:right;" |6.58%
| style="text-align:right;" |28
| style="text-align:right;" |504,563
| style="text-align:right;" |6.85%
| style="text-align:right;" |1,207
| style="text-align:right;" |478,659
| style="text-align:right;" |6.65%
| style="text-align:right;" |65
|-
| 
| style="text-align:left;" | People's Movement Party  ( - PMP)
| style="text-align:right;" |72,556
| style="text-align:right;" |10.99%
| style="text-align:right;" |0
| style="text-align:right;" |353,005
| style="text-align:right;" |4.73%
| style="text-align:right;" |50
| style="text-align:right;" |420,791
| style="text-align:right;" |5.72%
| style="text-align:right;" |2,137
| style="text-align:right;" |423,147
| style="text-align:right;" |5.88%
| style="text-align:right;" |67
|-
| style="background-color: |
| style="text-align:left;" | PRO Romania ( - PRO RO)
| style="text-align:right;" |5,315
| style="text-align:right;" |0.80%
| style="text-align:right;" |0
| style="text-align:right;" |331,878
| style="text-align:right;" |4.45%
| style="text-align:right;" |36
| style="text-align:right;" |381,535
| style="text-align:right;" |5.18%
| style="text-align:right;" |1,885
| style="text-align:right;" |356,030
| style="text-align:right;" |4.95%
| style="text-align:right;" |56
|-
| 
| style="text-align:left;" | Democratic Alliance of Hungarians in Romania  ( - UDMR)
| style="text-align:right;" |-
| style="text-align:right;" |-
| style="text-align:right;" |-
| style="text-align:right;" |299,334
| style="text-align:right;" |4.01%
| style="text-align:right;" |199
| style="text-align:right;" |362,442
| style="text-align:right;" |4.92%
| style="text-align:right;" |2,360
| style="text-align:right;" |379,924
| style="text-align:right;" |5.28%
| style="text-align:right;" |92
|-
| 
| style="text-align:left;" | Alliance of Liberals and Democrats ( - ALDE)
| style="text-align:right;" |9,892
| style="text-align:right;" |1.49%
| style="text-align:right;" |0
| style="text-align:right;" |124,649
| style="text-align:right;" |1.67%
| style="text-align:right;" |15
| style="text-align:right;" |189,665
| style="text-align:right;" |2.58%
| style="text-align:right;" |861
| style="text-align:right;" |209,411
| style="text-align:right;" |2.91%
| style="text-align:right;" |15
|-
| 
| style="text-align:left;" | Other political parties, independent contenders, and local alliances
| style="text-align:right;" |39,034
| style="text-align:right;" |5.91%
| style="text-align:right;" |0
| style="text-align:right;" |1,140,903
| style="text-align:right;" |15.30%
| style="text-align:right;" |282
| style="text-align:right;" |1,086,907
| style="text-align:right;" |14.76%
| style="text-align:right;" |3,448
| style="text-align:right;" |1,528,189
| style="text-align:right;" |21.24%
| style="text-align:right;" |209
|-
| style="text-align:left;" colspan = 2 | Total:
| style="text-align:right;" |660,118
| style="text-align:right;" |100
| style="text-align:right;" |1
| style="text-align:right;" |7,457,093
| style="text-align:right;" |100
| style="text-align:right;" |3,176
| style="text-align:right;" |7,361,818
| style="text-align:right;" |100
| style="text-align:right;" |39,900
| style="text-align:right;" |7,193,985
| style="text-align:right;" |100
| style="text-align:right;" |1,340
|-
| style="text-align:left;" colspan=20 | Notes
|-
| style="text-align:left;" colspan=20 | Sources: Romanian Permanent Electoral Authority
|-
|}

Judicial branch

|President of the High Court of Cassation and Justice
|Cristina Tarcea
|None
|2016
|-
|President of the Superior Council of Magistrates
|Lia Savonea
|None
|January 2019
|}

The Romanian legal system, based on the Napoleonic Code, is inquisitorial. The judiciary is independent, and judges appointed by the president are not removable. The president and other judges of the Supreme Court are appointed for six-year terms and may serve consecutive terms. Proceedings are public, except in special circumstances provided for by law.

Judicial power is vested in a hierarchical system of courts, culminating with the supreme court: Înalta Curte de Justiție și Casație (High Court of Cassation and Justice), whose judges are appointed by the president on the recommendation of the Superior Council of Magistrates.

The Ministry of Justice represents the general interests of society and defends the rule of law and citizens' rights and freedoms. The ministry exercises its power through independent, impartial public prosecutors.

Constitutional issues 

|President of the Constitutional Court
|Valer Dorneanu
|None
|June 2016
|}

The (Constitutional Court) judges issues of constitutionality invoked in any court and judges the compliance of laws (or other state regulations) with the Romanian Constitution. The court, outside the judicial branch, follows the tradition of the French Constitutional Council with nine judges serving nine-year, non-renewable terms. Since the 2003 revision of the constitution, its decisions cannot be overturned by a parliamentary majority.

Regional institutions

For territorial and administrative purposes, Romania is divided into 41 counties (județe, singular județ) and the city of Bucharest. Each county is governed by an elected council. Local councils and elected mayors are the public authorities in villages and towns. The county council coordinates the activities of village and town councils.

The central government appoints a prefect for each county and Bucharest, who represents the government at the local level and directs the ministries and other central agencies at the county level. A prefect may block the action of a local authority if he deems it unlawful or unconstitutional, with the matter then adjudicated by an administrative court.

Under legislation enacted in January 1999, local councils control the spending of their allocations from the central government budget and have the authority to raise additional revenue locally. Although centrally-appointed prefects formerly had significant authority over the budget, this is now limited to a review of expenditures to determine their constitutionality.

Since 1989 

Romania has made considerable progress in institutionalizing democratic principles, civil liberties, and respect for human rights since the Romanian Revolution in December 1989. Nevertheless, many present-day Romanian politicians are former members of the Romanian Communist Party (PCR) and have also had ties with the Romanian secret police (i.e. Securitatea). Since membership in the party was a requirement for advancement before 1989, many people joined to get ahead rather than because of ideological conviction; however, the communist past of some Romanian politicians remains highly controversial to the current day.

1990–1992 

The Romanian Communist Party (PCR) officially ceased to exist after the December 1989 Romanian Revolution. An ad interim/acting government swiftly took office starting in late December 1989 which consisted of National Salvation Front (FSN) members and would eventually govern Romania well up until 1992. The FSN had initially not decided to run in the 1990 elections but subsequently retracted their initial position and opted to participate in the 1990 Romanian general election, having the full support of state-owned media and an overwhelming majority of the voters during the electoral campaign, thereby eventually securing a landslide win.

Prior to the 1990 Romanian general election, over 200 new political parties sprang up just after 1989, most of them gravitating towards their leaders rather than revolving around political programs or full-fledged geopolitical agendas. Nevertheless, all major political parties espoused democracy and free market reforms to varying degrees or extents. The largest political party by far, the governing National Salvation Front (FSN), proposed slow, cautious economic reforms, and an artificial, weak social safety net (mostly for the working class of the still operating factories of the heavy industries).

In stark contrast, the main opposition parties, more specifically the National Liberal Party (PNL) and the Christian Democratic National Peasants' Party (PNŢCD), favored rapid, sweeping economic reforms, immediate privatization (which would have caused a shock therapy) as well as a drastic reduction and even total exclusion of former Communist Party (PCR) members from public Romanian political life. Apart from PCR members, the early demands of the Romanian historical democratic parties were also the reduction of the undercover members of the former Securitate (which could have been PCR members as well) from all areas of public life (thereby endorsing the Proclamation of Timișoara and the lustration law against the former Romanian secret police).

In the 1990 presidential and legislative elections, the FSN and its presidential candidate, Ion Iliescu, won with a large majority of the votes (67.02 and 85.07 percent, respectively). The strongest opposition parties in the Senate were the Hungarian minority-oriented Democratic Alliance of Hungarians in Romania (UDMR/RMDSZ) (with 7.20 percent) and the National Liberal Party (PNL) (with 7.06 percent), followed by the Christian Democratic National Peasants' Party (PNȚCD) with only 2.50 percent and the Romanian Ecologist Party (with only 1.38 percent) as well other minor centre-right parties (e.g. Liberal Union–Brătianu, National Reconstruction Party of Romania, and the Democratic Group of the Centre) with less than one percent.

After FSN Prime Minister Petre Roman's dismissal a few months before the 1992 general elections (following a late 1991 Mineriad), the FSN split in two. President Iliescu's supporters formed a new political party, namely the Democratic National Salvation Front (FDSN) which will later turn into PDSR and then PSD, while Roman's supporters retained the FSN name (which will later turn into PD and then PDL respectively).

1992–1996 

The 1992 local, legislative, and presidential elections indicated a major political rift between the urban centres and the countryside. Rural voters, grateful for the restoration of most agricultural land to farmers but fearful of change, strongly favored President Iliescu and the FDSN; the urban electorate favored the CDR (a coalition of several parties – the strongest of which were the PNŢCD and the PNL – and several other civic organizations as well) and quicker reform. Iliescu easily won re-election from a field of five other candidates, and the FDSN won a plurality/relative majority of seats in both chambers of the Romanian Parliament.

With the CDR, the second-largest parliamentary group, reluctant to participate in a national-unity coalition, the FDSN (now the PDSR) formed a government under Prime Minister and economist Nicolae Văcăroiu with parliamentary support on behalf of the nationalists Romanian National Unity Party (PUNR) and Greater Romania Party (PRM) as well as the extreme left-wing Socialist Party of Labour (PSM) led by former PCR Prime Minister Ilie Verdeț. The future coalition would be labeled by the press as the "Red Quadrilateral" (originally known in Romanian as Patrulaterul Roșu).

In January 1994, the governing coalition's stability became problematic when the PUNR threatened to withdraw its support unless it received cabinet portfolios. After intense negotiations, two PUNR members received cabinet portfolios in the Văcăroiu government in August of the same year. The following month, the incumbent Justice Minister also joined the PUNR. Nevertheless, subsequently, the PRM and the PSM left the coalition in October and December 1995, respectively.

1996–2000 

The 1996 local elections indicated a major shift in the political orientation of the Romanian electorate, with opposition parties sweeping Bucharest and most of the larger cities in Transylvania, Banat, Bukovina, and Dobruja. The trend continued in that year's legislative and presidential elections when the opposition dominated the cities and made strong inroads into rural areas previously dominated by President Iliescu and the PDSR (which lost many voters in their traditional stronghold constituencies outside Transylvania).

The opposition campaign emphasized the need to squelch corruption and introduce economic reform favoring liberalization and the free market. This message resonated with voters, resulting in a historical victory for the CDR coalition and the election of Emil Constantinescu as president (partly due to Corneliu Coposu's death as well). To secure its electoral majority, the CDR invited Petre Roman's Democratic Party (the former FSN) and the UDMR/RMDSZ (representing the Hungarian minority) to join the government. Although over the next four years, Romania had three prime ministers (and despite internal frictions), the governing parties preserved their coalition and initiated a series of much-needed reforms.

2000–2004 

Constantinescu stated in 2000 that he is no longer running for a second term, claiming that the system had defeated him. The CDR-led coalition with its new candidate Mugur Isărescu lost the first round of presidential elections held in November 2000 as a result of popular dissatisfaction with infighting among the constituent parties during the preceding four years and the economic hardship brought about by structural reforms. In the second round, Ion Iliescu, running again as the Social Democratic Party (PSD) candidate, won by a wide margin over extreme nationalist Greater Romania Party (PRM) candidate Corneliu Vadim Tudor. Iliescu subsequently appointed Adrian Năstase Prime Minister. In the Parliament, the PSD government (like its predecessor) relied on the support of the UDMR/RMDSZ, which did not join the cabinet but negotiated annual packages of legislation and other measures favoring Romania's ethnic Hungarians (essentially through a confidence and supply agreement).

Năstase, in his four years as Prime Minister, continued the previous government's pro-Western foreign policy. The period was characterized by political stability unprecedented in post-communist Romania and consistent economic growth. Romania joined NATO in the spring of 2004 and signed an accession treaty to join the EU in 2007. However, the PSD government was plagued by allegations of corruption which would be significant factors in its eventual defeat in local and national elections in 2004.

In September 2003, the Democratic Party (PD) and the National Liberal Party (PNL) formed an electoral alliance, more specifically the Justice and Truth (DA) Alliance, as a mainstream opposition bloc to the ruling PSD. The DA Alliance agreed, among other measures, to vote as a bloc in the parliament and local councils and run common candidates in national and local elections. In October 2003, the country held a referendum on several constitutional amendments deemed necessary for EU accession. The amendments included provisions to allow foreigners to own land in Romania and to change the president's term from four to five years.

2004–2008 

In 2004, Traian Băsescu, the then-leader of the Democratic Party (PD), won the presidential election by a narrow margin. Băsescu subsequently appointed former national liberal leader Călin Popescu-Tăriceanu as Prime Minister. Popescu-Tăriceanu headed a government composed of the PNL, PD, UDMR/RMDSZ, and PC (formerly known as the Romanian Humanist Party or PUR). In order to secure a parliamentary majority, the coalition government relied on the support of 18 parliamentary seats reserved for ethnic-minority representatives.

The government's narrow majority in the Parliament led to calls for early elections. In July 2005, Prime Minister Popescu-Tăriceanu voiced plans to resign, prompting new elections; he then backtracked, noting his and the cabinet's need to focus on relief efforts for summer floods. During its first year, the government was also tested by a successfully-resolved hostage crisis involving three Romanian journalists kidnapped in Iraq and avian influenza in several parts of the country, transmitted by wild birds migrating from Asia.

The government's overriding objective was the accession of Romania to the European Union (EU), and on 1 January 2007 Romania became the 26th member of the EU. The government also maintained good relations with the United States, signing an agreement in December 2005 which would allow American troops to train and serve at several Romanian military facilities. Băsescu and Popescu-Tăriceanu pledged to combat high-level corruption and implement broader reforms to modernize sectors such as the judicial system and healthcare.

On 19 April 2007, the Romanian Parliament suspended President Băsescu on charges of unconstitutional conduct. The suspension, passed by a 322–108 vote, opened the way for a national referendum on impeachment which failed by a large popular vote, and as such Băsescu was reinstated as President.

2008–2012 

The November 2008 parliamentary elections were close, with the Social Democrats (PSD) winning 33.9 percent of the vote, President Traian Băsescu's centre-right Liberal Democrats (PDL) taking 32.34 percent, and the ruling National Liberals (PNL) receiving 18.6 percent. The Liberal Democrats and Social Democrats formed a coalition after the election. Former prime minister Theodor Stolojan withdrew his candidacy for the premiership and President Băsescu nominated Emil Boc, president of the Liberal Democrats, as prime minister.

With the onset of the Great Recession, the Romanian political scene saw tensions between the president and the prime minister on the one hand as well as between the general population on the other hand. Tensions escalated with a 2012 political crisis and another attempt to impeach President Băsescu. In the referendum, more than 7.4 million people (nearly 90 percent) supported Băsescu's removal from office. However, the Constitutional Court invalidated the referendum because the majority of the population did not vote (the voter turnout was 46%); Băsescu had called the referendum a coup d'état and asked the public to boycott it. All these events have been heavily criticized by international political figures, most notably by German chancellor Angela Merkel.

2012–2016 

The legislative elections of 9 December 2012 were seen by the public as an opportunity for change and to oust Băsescu. The Social Liberal Union (USL) received a large majority in the Chamber of Deputies and the Senate (60.07 and 58.61 percent of the vote, respectively) and a record 395 seats. The new prime minister, Victor Ponta, quickly formed a government but the failure to adopt reforms quickly triggered a wave of protests against a government seen as not fulfilling the promises of the 2012 electoral campaign. Two other projects of national interest (shale drilling and the Roșia Montană mining project) unleashed more protests. The demonstrations, initially ecological in focus, became anti-government protests.

In early 2014, the PNL broke away from the USL and entered opposition. Along with the PDL, the PNL formed the Christian Liberal Alliance (ACL) to support the candidature of Klaus Iohannis as President of Romania and later agreed on a future merger that would retain the name of the National Liberal Party (PNL). Iohannis won a surprise victory in front of the incumbent PM Victor Ponta in the second round of the 2014 presidential elections, by a margin of 54.43%. At that time, many voters abroad were rightfully angry because they were not all given the right to cast their ballots, which represented one of the key reasons for Ponta's defeat.

In late 2015, another series of nationwide protests ultimately prompted Prime Minister Victor Ponta's resignation. Shortly afterward, President Iohannis appointed then independent-technocrat Dacian Cioloș as Prime Minister, who led a likewise independent-technocratic government between late 2015 and early 2017.

2016–2020 

The legislative elections of 11 December 2016 saw a predictable comeback of the PSD as the major party in the Romanian Parliament, as most opinion polls gave them an electoral score of at least 40%. Alongside ALDE (a main splinter group from the PNL), the PSD initially formed a governing coalition under Prime Minister Sorin Grindeanu.

In early 2017, a series of massive nationwide protests (the greatest in Romania's history) requested Grindeanu's resignation and early elections because of the government's secret procedure of giving an ordinance modifying the Penal Code and Penal Procedure Code on the night of 31 January. The PM along with the entire government refused to step down but decided to withdraw the decrees that started the protests on 5 February at the protests' peak.

Approximately four months later, tensions arose between PM Sorin Grindeanu and PSD leader Liviu Dragnea, which ultimately resulted in the loss of political support for the government on behalf of the PSD-ALDE coalition. The PM refused to resign but was eventually dismissed by a motion of no confidence passed by the Parliament with 241 votes (233 minimum needed).

Quickly afterward, Mihai Tudose was proposed by the socialists for the position of Prime Minister and was subsequently accepted by president Iohannis. However, just after 6 months of governance, he resigned from this dignity. Consequently, the ruling coalition nominated a new Prime Minister candidate in the person of Viorica Dăncilă, a former socialist MEP in2014–19 who was also accepted by the state president. She was also the first female Prime Minister of Romania. Subsequently, on 4 November 2019, after a motion of no confidence, the PSD minority government was replaced by a minority cabinet led by the National Liberal Party under Ludovic Orban. Furthermore, in November 2019, President Klaus Iohannis was re-elected by a landslide (with FDGR/DFDR, USR PLUS, and PMP support in the second round).

This period (i.e. the two years spanning between 2017 and 2019) was marked by governmental mayhem produced by the previous PSD-ALDE ruling coalition regarding their change of PMs as well as their intentions of changing both the Penal Code and the Penal Procedure Code, the Romanian society took to the streets of Bucharest and many other major cities of the country in huge numbers for more than 500 consecutive days in order to oppose the modification of these law packages, prompt early elections, as well as a referendum on the topic of justice.

2020–present 

The 2020 Romanian local elections which were held on 27 September were won by the PNL. Nonetheless, on 6 December, the PNL finished second in the 2020 Romanian legislative election. The election was won by the oppositional Social Democrats (PSD) who came in first. Shortly after the official results came out, Orban resigned from his position as PM and was replaced by Nicolae Ciucă as acting/ad interim PM.

In the meantime, the national liberals proceeded to negotiate the formation of a coalition government alongside USR PLUS and UDMR for a reportedly stable center-right governance for the next four years in Romania. The newly designated PM was therefore Florin Cîțu, a member of the National Liberal Party (PNL), who took office on 23 December 2020, after forming a three-party, center-right coalition consisting of the PNL, the USR PLUS, and the Democratic Alliance of Hungarians in Romania (UDMR/RMDSZ).

Subsequently, in early September 2021, USR PLUS decided to exit the Cîțu Cabinet and so the three centre-right party alliance was officially disbanded. Furthermore, PNL, Iohannis, and Cîțu triggered the major 2021 Romanian political crisis which lasted for nearly three months and consequently plunged the country into tremendous social and economic turmoil, until Nicolae Ciucă was invested PM along with the CNR cabinet in late November 2021. Even after Ciucă's investment, the catastrophic and heavily corrupted PNL-PSD-UDMR/RMDSZ governance has been keeping the country in tremendous social and economic turmoil, lacking solutions and not being able to display a vision for a proper governing on both a short and medium-term basis.

Foreign relations

On 1 January 2007, Romania became a member of the European Union (EU) in the fifth wave of EU enlargement. During the 2000s, Romania implemented a number of reforms to prepare for EU accession, including the consolidation of its democratic systems, the institution of the rule of law, the acknowledgement of respect for human rights, the commitment to personal freedom of expression, and the implementation of a functioning free-market economy.

Romania joined the North Atlantic Treaty Organization (NATO) on March 29, 2004, following the decision taken at the Prague Summit, in November 2002. Romania was a partner to the allied forces during the Gulf War, particularly during its service as president of the UN Security Council. Romania has been active in peacekeeping operations in UNAVEM in Angola, IFOR/SFOR in Bosnia, Albania, in Afghanistan and sent 860 troops to Iraq after the invasion led by the United States.

Romania has developed strong relations with Hungary, with the latter playing a key role in supporting Romania's bid to join the EU. Romania's ethnic Hungarian party also participated in all the government coalitions between 1996 and 2008 and from 2009. In 1996, Romania signed and ratified a basic bilateral treaty with Hungary that settled outstanding disagreements, laying the foundation for closer, more cooperative relations.

Bulgarian relations with Romania feature regular official visits by the two presidents. In the first half of the 20th century, Romania and Bulgaria had a serious conflict over the Dobruja region. This dispute, while now largely forgotten, escalated into all out war in 1913. The territorial dispute between the two countries ended with the Treaty of Craiova.

See also
 Human rights in Romania
 Military of Romania
 Relations of Romania with Moldova
 Movement for unification of Romania and Moldova

References

External links
List of Romanian Embassies
World Statesmen: Romania, including a comprehensive list of princes, monarchs, prime ministers, etc.
Erik Herron's Guide to Politics of East Central Europe and Eurasia

Further reading
 John Hickman and Chris Little, "Seat/Vote Proportionality in Romanian and Spanish Parliamentary Elections", Journal of Southern Europe and the Balkans Volume 2, Number 2, November 2000.